Michael Robert Pritchard (born October 26, 1969) is a former American football player who played college football at the University of Colorado and professionally in the National Football League (NFL) for the Atlanta Falcons, Denver Broncos, Seattle Seahawks over a nine-year career.

Pritchard grew up in Las Vegas and starred as an all-purpose back. His athletic talent attracted attention from collegiate football programs from across the nation.  Pritchard eventually accepted an athletic scholarship offer from head coach Bill McCartney of the University of Colorado. There, Pritchard was a versatile player who excelled at a variety of positions, including wide receiver, kick returner, and running back.

As a senior in 1990, he was named first-team All-Big Eight at wide receiver, also garnering honorable mention All-American honors from the UPI.  That same year he was named the most valuable player on CU's national championship team, the only one in school history. Pritchard was later inducted into the University of Colorado sports Hall of Fame in 2015.

Pritchard  was the first of nine Colorado players selected in the 1991 NFL Draft. He was selected 13th overall by the Atlanta Falcons. He played nine seasons in the NFL, spending time with Atlanta (1991–93), Denver (1994–95) and Seattle (1996–99).  Pritchard had his best professional season in 1992 while he was with the Falcons. That year he caught 77 receptions for 827 yards and scored 5 touchdowns. In 127 career NFL games, he caught 422 passes for 5,178 yards (12.3 yard average) and scored 26 touchdowns.

After his playing career, he moved back to his hometown of Las Vegas where he embarked on a broadcasting career doing color commentary on the UNLV radio network. He has also appeared on TV and radio as a commentator and in both the Las Vegas and Denver areas. Pritchard currently co-hosts a radio morning show on KRLV in Las Vegas.

References

External links
 

1969 births
Living people
American football wide receivers
American sports radio personalities
Atlanta Falcons players
Colorado Buffaloes football players
Denver Broncos players
Seattle Seahawks players
People from North Las Vegas, Nevada
Sportspeople from Sumter, South Carolina
Players of American football from Nevada
African-American players of American football
21st-century African-American people
20th-century African-American sportspeople